Dan Flannery was an Australian professional rugby league footballer who played in the 1910s. He played for Eastern Suburbs in the New South Wales Rugby League (NSWRL) competition.

Background
Flannery was born in Sydney, New South Wales, Australia.

Playing career
Flannery made his first grade debut for Eastern Suburbs against Newtown in Round 1 1913 at the Sydney Cricket Ground. Flannery was a member of the Eastern Suburbs sides that won the 1913 premiership and City Cups in 1914 and 1915.

References

Australian rugby league players
Sydney Roosters players
Year of birth missing
Year of death missing
Rugby league players from Sydney
Rugby league fullbacks
Rugby league centres
Rugby league wingers